The Chinakkathoor Pooram is an elephant pageant which is held annually at the sacred Sree Chinakkathoor Bhagavathy Temple, at Palappuram in Palakkad district in north Kerala. A huge procession of 27 festooned tuskers is the highlight of the festival. The festival is celebrated in Kumbham month of Malayalam calendar.

Locality performs traditional art forms like Vellattu, Theyyam, Poothanum thirayum, Kaalavela, Kuthiravela, Aandi Vedan, Karivela on the Panchavadyam or the temple orchestra. The popular ritualistic show puppetry, Tholpavakoothu, is performed at the temple premises every evening. This show continues for 17 days before conclusion of the festival i.e. pooram. Sixteen decorated models of the kuthira (horse) and eight kaala (bull) are brought ceremoniously to the temple by devotees in a grand procession.

Holiday is declared by the District Collector in all government offices and educational institutions of Ottapalam municipality and the Lakkidi-Perur-I grama panchayat.

How to reach

By Rail

Nearest railway station is Ottapalam which is about 5.1 km from the shrine. It is one of the major railway stations between Palakkad and Shoranur in the Konkan route and Wadakkanchery in the Kanyakumari/Alapuzha route.

By Bus

Public as well as private buses running on Palakkad-Shoranur (Kulappully) State Highway passes through Ottappalam.

By Air

Nearest airport is Coimbatore in the neighbouring state of Tamil Nadu which is about 85 km from shrine.

Calicut International Airport, Karippur, Cochin International Airport, Nedumbassery, and Coimbatore Domestic Airport are the other nearest airports.
Time to celebrate

In Kerala, festival dates are decided in accordance with the Malayalam calendar and the local traditions and customs.

Elephant festivals in Kerala
Festivals in Palakkad district